The Tyry (Tırıı) is a river in the Sakha Republic (Yakutia), Russia, a right tributary of the Aldan, part of the Lena basin. 

There were mining settlements in the river valley, operating the coal and other deposits of the river basin, such as Nezhdaninskoye. Nowadays the nearest permanently inhabited place in the area of the Tyry is Khandyga of Tompo District to the north of the river's mouth.

The river is a known destination for rafting and kayaking, as well as fishing. Among the fishes present in the river and its tributaries are taimen, grayling, perch and pike, among other species.

Course
The Tyry has its sources in the southern slopes of the Suntar-Khayata Range. In the upper section of its course the river flows through a narrow valley across mountainous terrain, heading roughly southwestwards and cutting across the Skalisty Range and the Sette Daban, where its valley widens and the river divides into branches. The river turns then to the WNW and cuts across the northern section of the Ulakhan-Bom. After the Tyry exits the mountain area it enters a wide floodplain, dividing into many channels and making a wide bend to the southwest. Finally if meets the right bank of the Aldan River, upstream from the mouth of the Eastern Khandyga,  from the confluence of the Aldan with the Lena River. 

The river freezes before mid October and stays frozen until mid May.

See also
List of rivers of Russia

References

External links
Sentyabr occurrence, Tyry River, Sakha Republic (Yakutia)
Fishing in the river (in Russian)

Rivers of the Sakha Republic
Verkhoyansk Range
Suntar-Khayata